The Junta Nacional de Homologación de Trofeos de Caza (JNHTC) is the governing body for the control and assessment of trophy hunting in Spain, a branch of the Ministry of Agriculture. It was founded in 1950 and first presided by Eduardo de Figueroa, 8th Count of Yebes. Since 1999, the President is Alonso Álvarez de Toledo, 12th Marquess of Valdueza, who has also served as vice-president of the International Council for Game and Wildlife Conservation and was the head of the Spanish delegation.

The origins of the Junta can be found in 1950, when a group of Spanish noblemen, namely the Marquess of Valdueza and the counts of Yebes, Villada and Seefried designed formulas to establish a valuation of big game trophies by points.

The success of the 1950 Trophy Exhibition held in Madrid encouraged the Administration to officially recognise those who had carried out the technical work, thus establishing the Junta Nacional de Homologación de Trofeos de Caza y Estadística Cinegética, which was assigned to the Superior Council of Continental Fishing, Hunting and National Parks.

Since its creation, the Junta has published catalogues every quinquennium listing every measured medal trophy of the more than a dozen big game species that can be hunted in Spain (it has recently included the Balearean boc and excluded the Iberian lynx and the Cantabrian brown bear since 1973). These include the Spanish wolf, wild boar, Iberian red deer, fallow, roe, sarrio, rebeco, Iberian ibex, mouflon, arruí and Balearean boc. As of April 2019, more than 80,000 trophies had been registered by the Junta as having been awarded a gold, silver or bronze medal.

Functions

The Junta is the body in charge of the control, measurement and assessment of hunting trophies in Spain. It is an organism with deep institutional roots, with more than 50 years of existence at the service of hunting activity, in the classification and homologation of the biometric characteristics of the different species.

Hunting, like all forest harvesting, is an inherent part of the economic activity of the forestry sector under the jurisdiction of the Ministry de Agriculture, Fishing, Nutrition and Environment, due to its link to both rural development and nature conservation policies.

It defines the valuation formulas corresponding to each species, adjusting as far as possible those adopted by the International Council for Game and Wildlife Conservation (CIC), and establishes the minimum scores required for the different categories (Gold, Silver and Bronze).

It has the following functions:

Cooperate for the correct application of said formulas, promoting the unification of interpretation criteria among the approval committees of the different Autonomous Communities, preferably attending to the criteria defined by the CIC.
Define the procedures for the homologation of trophies to access the lists of the National Archive of Hunting Trophies, while defining the concepts of National Record of each species, absolute historical record or any other that the Board may consider appropriate to stimulate the management of hunting wealth based on a sustainable use of hunting resources.
Define the trophy cataloging systems and promote and promote the coordination of these systems between the different approval committees of the Autonomous Communities in order to consolidate the cataloging in the National Archive of Hunting Trophies.
Facilitate the exchange of information and records of the National Archive of Hunting Trophies with each of the homologation commissions of the Autonomous Communities when required.
Maintain close collaboration with international organizations responsible for tasks similar to those of the Board.
Act as an advisory body in the field of hunting, hunting management and conservation of ecosystems for the General State Administration and for the different Autonomous Communities.
Inform the General Directorate of Rural Development and Forest Policy regarding matters related to big game that could affect more than one Autonomous Community, either at its request or on its own initiative, and propose the measures it deems appropriate.
Propose to the General Directorate for Rural Development and Forest Policy the renewal, increase or decrease of its members when circumstances require it, as well as the appointment of collaborating advisers.
Measure and approve all kinds of Spanish hunting trophies, both in official competitions and exhibitions and at the request of the owners, and issue the supporting documents for the approvals carried out, without prejudice to the powers of the autonomous communities.
Prepare the catalogs of hunting trophies, in which the homologated trophies will be collected and as many data as necessary in order to highlight the evolution and development of the different species.
Ensure the protection of the biological diversity of the Spanish hunting fauna and, in particular, for its genetic purity.
Value the hunting resources existing in Spain and making these values transcend the existing international organizations in the matter.

Measurable species

The following is a list of all the big-game species in Spain that are currently or have in the past been measured. The Junta has excluded the Cantabrian brown bear and the Iberian lynx since 1973 (due to their hunting prohibition). Below is the official benchmark of points to assess whether the hunted animal in question qualifies as gold, silver or bronze medal. Only a small percentage of hunted animals in Spain is worthy of a medal, which the Junta measures in accordance to the CIC.

If a trophy is awarded any of the three available medals, it will be published in the Junta catalogues that are produced every five-year periods, with relation to the species, the hunter and the finca or national park it was harvested in. For instance, the Duke of Württemberg harvested a 223,35 point (silver medal) Iberian ibex in Gredos National Park in 1977, which at the time placed him 204th on the national ranking.

To date, only four people have hunted all big-game species in the fauna of Spain: the marquesses of Villaviciosa de Asturias and Valdueza, Carlos Rein and Infanta Alicia of Spain, as a privilege of a time when no species were protected.

Iberian wolf

Gold medal: 41
Silver medal: 39 - 40,99
Bronze medal: 37 - 38,99

Wild boar

Gold medal: 110
Silver medal: 105 - 109,99
Bronze medal: 100 - 104,99

Fallow deer

Gold medal: 180
Silver medal: 170 - 170,99
Bronze medal: 160 - 169,99

Iberian red deer

Gold medal: 181
Silver medal: 173 - 180,99
Bronze medal: 165 - 172,99

Roe deer

Gold medal: 130
Silver medal: 115 - 129,99
Bronze medal: 105 - 114,99

Sarrio

Male
Gold medal: 97
Silver medal: 92 - 96,99
Bronze medal: 87 - 91,99

Female
Gold medal: 93
Silver medal: 88 - 92,99
Bronze medal: 83 - 87,99

Rebeco

Male
Gold medal: 85
Silver medal: 81,5 - 84,99
Bronze medal: 78 - 81,49

Female
Gold medal: 81
Silver medal: 77,5 - 84,99
Bronze medal: 74 - 77,49

Iberian ibex

North zone

For those harvested in the provinces of Ávila, Burgos, León, Salamanca, Segovia, Zamora, Cáceres (north of River Tagus), Madrid, Lugo, Ourense, Asturias, Tarragona, Barcelona, Castellón and Teruel.

Gold medal: 230
Silver medal: 220 - 229,99
Bronze medal: 205 - 219,99

Mid zone

For those harvested in the provinces of Valencia, Alicante, Murcia, Albacete, Ciudad Real, Cuenca, Guadalajara, Toledo, Cáceres (south of River Tagus) and Zaragoza.

Gold medal: 225
Silver medal: 215 - 224,99
Bronze medal: 205 - 214,99

South zone

For those harvested in the provinces of Almería, Cádiz, Córdoba, Granada, Jaén, Málaga y Seville.

Gold medal: 220
Silver medal: 210 - 219,99
Bronze medal: 195 - 209,99

Mouflon

Gold medal: 205
Silver medal: 195 - 204,99
Bronze medal: 185 - 194,99

Arruí

Gold medal: 350
Silver medal: 330 - 349,99
Bronze medal: 310 - 329,99

Balearean boc

Gold medal: 310,00
Silver medal: 290,00 - 309,99
Bronze medal: 270,00 - 289,99

Cantabrian brown bear

Gold medal: 51,01
Silver medal: 47,01 - 51,00
Bronze medal: 42,01 - 47,00

Iberian lynx

Gold medal: 23,01
Silver medal: 21,51 - 23,00
Bronze medal: 19,01 - 21,50

Governing body

President
The Marquess of Valdueza

Vice-president
Valentín Almansa de Lara

Spokesmen
The Viscount of Salinas
Cástor Cañedo Angoso
Juan Luis Oliva de Suelves Cazurro
Juan del Yerro San Román
José Luis López-Schümmer Treviño
Francisco Landaluce Domínguez
Jorge Bernad Danzberger
The Duke of Algeciras
Juan José Viola Cardoso
Luis de la Peña Fernández-Nespral
Jose Ignacio Crespo Fernández
Jose Manuel Jaquotot Sáenz de Miera
Jose Hernández Fernández
Adolfo Díaz-Ambrona Medrano
Ángel Fernández Díaz
Guillermo Ceballos Watling
Roberto González Hernando

Secretary
Carlos Guillén del Rey

Timeline of presidents

 1950 – 1979 The Count of Yebes
 1979 – 1982 Adolfo Domínguez Merelles
 1982 – 1992 The Marquess of Laula
 1992 – 1999 Juan Luis Oliva de Suelves
 1999 –          The Marquess of Valdueza

Territorial delegations

See also
Montería (hunt)

References

Bibliography

External links 

Official Site of the Ministry of Agriculture, Fishing and Nutrition 
Official website of the CIC

International environmental organizations
Wildlife conservation organizations
Organisations based in Madrid
Organizations established in 1950